Leik Munhtaw (1432–1454) was the 14th king of the Hanthawaddy Pegu Kingdom in Burma for seven months in 1453–54. He came to power by assassinating his first cousin King Binnya Kyan. Binnya Kyan himself had come to power in 1451 by murdering his cousin King Binnya Waru, and went on to kill off male descendants of King Razadarit. Leik Munhtaw, son of King Binnya Ran I and a grandson of Razadarit, got to Binnya Kyan, also a grandson of Razadarit, first. Leik Munhtaw went on to kill more rivals. In early 1454, palace ministers killed Leik Munhtaw, leaving no male heir of Razadarit's line. The ministers chose his daughter Shin Sawbu to be the next ruler of Hanthawaddy.

Brief
Various Burmese chronicles do not agree on the key dates of the king's life.

Notes

References

Bibliography
 
 
 
 
 
 

Hanthawaddy dynasty
1454 deaths
Year of birth unknown
15th-century Burmese monarchs